Qorashina is an urban-type settlement in Dehqonobod District of Qashqadaryo Region in Uzbekistan. It is the capital of Dehqonobod District. Its population was 5,285 people in 1989, and 11,900 in 2016.

References

Populated places in Qashqadaryo Region
Urban-type settlements in Uzbekistan